The Platinum Collection is a compilation album by Italian singer Mina, issued in 2004.

The 52-track, three-disc box set details Mina's recording career at PDU starting in 1968. The set highlights Mina's best moments and give a depth that is essential to her fans, but does not include any tracks recorded by Mina for Italdisc (1959-1964) or Rifi (1964-1967).

Track listing 
CD 1 (1968-1975)
 "L'importante è finire"
 "Non gioco più"
 "Amor mio"
 "Io e te da soli"
 "Insieme"
 "Parole parole"
 "Bugiardo e incosciente"
 "Non credere"
 "E poi..."
 "Emozioni"
 "La voce del silenzio"
 "Fa qualcosa"
 "Vorrei che fosse amore"
 "E penso a te"
 "Zum zum zum"
 "Grande grande grande"
 "Caro"
 "Dai dai domani"
 "La musica è finita"

CD 2 (1976-1989)
 "Questione di feeling"
 "Ancora ancora ancora"
 "Magica follia"
 "Les cornichons (Big Nick)"
 "Una lunga storia d'amore"
 "Già visto"
 "Momento magico"
 "Allora sì"
 "Via di qua"
 "Senza fiato"
 "Se il mio canto sei tu"
 "Rose su rose"
 "Ma che bontà"
 "Un'aquila nel cuore"
 "Buonanotte buonanotte"
 "Città vuota (It's a lonely town)"
 "Tres palabras"
 "Il cielo in una stanza"

CD 3 (1990-2003)
 "Neve"
 "Il pazzo"
 "Volami nel cuore"
 "Johnny"
 "Non c'è più audio"
 "In vista della sera"
 "Can't Take My Eyes Off of You"
 "Un'estate fa"
 "Fosse vero"
 "Amore, amore, amore mio"
 "Raso"
 "Something"
 "Come stai"
 "Il corvo"
 "Fortissimo"
 "Cry Me a River"

Charts

Year-end charts

Certifications and sales

References

Mina (Italian singer) compilation albums
2004 compilation albums